Anjalai Ammal was a social worker and reformer from Kadalur. She started her political activism in 1921 with the Non-Cooperation Movement and later took part in the Neil Statue Satyagraha, Salt Satyagraha and Quit India Movement. Her courage was so well known that Mahathma Gandhi called her South India's Jhansi Rani. When he came to Kadalur to meet Anjalai Ammal, the British government prohibited him their meet. But Anjalai Ammal still magaed to meet him by dressing up in a burqa. She also encouraged her nine-year-old daughter to participate in the protests, who was named Leelavathy by Gandhi himself. Granddaughter of Anjalai Ammal, Mangai A, explains, “My grandmother, Anjalai Ammal was in jail for more than four and half years and she gave birth to her last son in the jail itself. Her biography is included in the Class 8 second semester Tamil text book. My grandfather, Murugappa, my maternal aunt, Leelavathy, and her husband, Jamadhagni, were also freedom fighters.” 

In 1931, she presided over The All India Women Congress Meet. In 1932, she took part in another struggle for which she was sent to Vellore prison. She was pregnant while she was sent to Vellore prison. She was released on bail on account of her delivery. Within two weeks after her son was born, she was sent back to the Vellore prison. Once Gandhi came to Kadalur, but the British government prohibited him to visit Anjalai Ammal. But Anjalai Ammal came in a horse cart wearing burqa and visited him. Due to her courage, Gandhi called her South India's Jhansi Rani. After India's independence in 1947, she was elected as the member of the Tamil Nadu legislative assembly thrice.

She died on 20th February 1961.

References 

1890s births
1961 deaths
Indian independence activists

https://anjalaiammal.com/